The Almaty Challenger is a professional tennis tournament played on clay courts. It is currently part of the Association of Tennis Professionals (ATP) Challenger Tour. It is held annually in Almaty, Kazakhstan since 2017.

Past finals

Singles

Doubles

See also
 2021 ATP Challenger Tour

References

External links
 ATP Tournament Profile

ATP Challenger Tour
Clay court tennis tournaments
Tennis tournaments in Kazakhstan
Recurring sporting events established in 2017